Edward Alan "Ted" Ryan (14 June 1925 – 22 November 2003) was an Australian rules footballer who played with Footscray in the Victorian Football League (VFL). Ryan started out at Oakleigh in the Victorian Football Association, from where he was recruited by Footscray. He appeared in six league games for Footscray, from rounds three to eight, in the 1945 VFL season. Oakleigh regained Ryan's services in 1946, without him being granted a clearance. He was full-back in Oakleigh's 1950 premiership team, a position he was only playing because of an injury to backman Alex Boyle. Also that year he was a member of the VFA representative team that played in Canberra in 1950. In 1951 he left for Hampden Football League club Mortlake, which he coached for three seasons. He returned to Oakleigh in 1954.

References

1925 births
Australian rules footballers from Victoria (Australia)
Western Bulldogs players
Oakleigh Football Club players
Mortlake Football Club players
Mortlake Football Club coaches
2003 deaths